Hong Lim (born 11 November 1950) is an Australian politician. He was a member of the Victorian Legislative Assembly from 1996 to 2018, representing the seat of Clayton until 2014 and Clarinda from 2014 to his retirement in 2018. He represented the Labor Party.

Lim was born in Cambodia, and is of Chinese Cambodian origins. He was educated at schools in Phnom Penh before coming to Australia in 1970, and then at the University of Tasmania and Monash University, Melbourne, where he graduated in arts. He was Chairman of the Victorian Indo-Chinese Communities Council 1984–92 and president of the Cambodian Association of Victoria 1992–96. He was a commissioner of the Victorian Ethnic Affairs Commission 1985–92, and a member of the Monash University Council 1996–98.

Lim was elected to the Legislative Assembly in 1996, and was an appointed Parliamentary Secretary to the Minister for Victorian Communities, John Thwaites, in 2002.

Lim retired in 2018 after 22 years in parliament.

References

External links
 Mr Lim's select guest list
 Parliamentary voting record of Hong Lim at Victorian Parliament Tracker
  林美丰 (archived from http://www.australianet.net/chinese7.htm

1950 births
Australian Labor Party members of the Parliament of Victoria
Labor Right politicians
Australian politicians of Chinese descent
Cambodian emigrants to Australia
Cambodian people of Chinese descent
Living people
Naturalised citizens of Australia
Members of the Victorian Legislative Assembly
21st-century Australian politicians